Nakhtmin (also Minnakht) was an Ancient Egyptian scribe and general during the reign of pharaoh Tutankhamun.

Nakhtmin may also refer to:

 Nakhtmin (scribe), Middle Kingdom Lector Priest whose stela is now in Zagreb
 Nakhtmin (charioteer), Nineteenth Dynasty military official under Ramesses II
 Nakhtmin (troop commander), Nineteenth Dynasty troop commander and royal envoy during the reign of Ramesses II